Jorge Peláez Sánchez (born 29 September 1996), commonly known as Canillas, is a Spanish professional footballer who plays for German club FV Ravensburg as a forward.

Club career
Born in Málaga, Canillas represented Málaga CF, CD Tirro Pichon, Atlético Madrid and Granada CF as a youth. On 29 November 2014, he made his senior debut  for Granada CF B, coming on as a substitute for Gabriel Corozo in a 1–0 defeat against Sevilla Atlético. On 23 July 2015, he signed a three-year contract extension with the club. On 1 September 2016, he was loaned out to Linares Deportivo. On 9 January 2017, he left Linares Deportivo. On the next day, his contract was terminated by mutual consent.

Canillas switched to UCAM Murcia CF B on 31 January 2017. After a stint with Écija Balompié, he moved abroad and joined Austrian club FC Blau-Weiß Linz on 7 June 2018.

Career statistics

References

External links

1996 births
Footballers from Málaga
Living people
Spanish footballers
Association football forwards
Club Recreativo Granada players
Linares Deportivo footballers
UCAM Murcia CF B players
Écija Balompié players
FC Blau-Weiß Linz players
SV Ried players
SV Horn players
Algeciras CF footballers
Atlético Sanluqueño CF players
FV Ravensburg players
Segunda División B players
2. Liga (Austria) players
Tercera División players
Austrian Regionalliga players
Oberliga (football) players
Spanish expatriate footballers
Spanish expatriate sportspeople in Austria
Expatriate footballers in Austria
Spanish expatriate sportspeople in Germany
Expatriate footballers in Germany